The 1974 NCAA Division III football season, part of college football in the United States organized by the National Collegiate Athletic Association at the Division III level, began in August 1974, and concluded with the NCAA Division III Football Championship in December 1974 at Garrett-Harrison Stadium in Phenix City, Alabama. The Central Dutch won their first Division III championship, defeating the Ithaca Bombers by a final score of 10−8.

Conference standings

Conference champions

Postseason
The 1974 NCAA Division III Football Championship playoffs were the second annual single-elimination tournament to determine the national champion of men's NCAA Division III college football. The championship game was held at Garrett-Harrison Stadium in Phenix City, Alabama. Like the 1973 championship, this year's bracket featured only four teams.

Playoff bracket

See also
1974 NCAA Division I football season
1974 NCAA Division II football season
1974 NAIA Division I football season
1974 NAIA Division II football season

References